Adeline Werligh (23 December 1813- 11 September 1907) was a Danish-Norwegian stage actor and theatre manager.

Louise Adeline Werligh Falck was the daughter of Christian Gottfried Falck and Cathrine Marie Ostenfeld. 
She was born in Tranekær, Denmark. She was first married to Fredrich Christian August Werligh (1795–1841)  and toured with his theatre company in Denmark, Norway and Sweden from 1830.  When she became a widow in 1841, she took over the company.  She married a second time in 1844 to Herman Didrik Hagerup (1816-1900) son of Norwegian official Edvard Hagerup (1781–1853). They were the parents of  Nina Hagerup (1845–1935), wife of the composer Edvard Grieg.
 
She was the first woman to become theatre manager in Denmark.  She was a successful manager of the Werligh company, which played an important role in both Denmark and Norway during the 1830s and 1840s.  As an actor, she was also given very good reviews. She retired after he remarriage in 1844.
From 1850 to 1851, she was a  drama instructor at  Det norske Theater  in Bergen.

References

1907 deaths
1813 births
19th-century theatre managers
19th-century Danish actresses
Women theatre managers and producers
19th-century Danish businesswomen